Romani languages are the languages spoken by the Roma people, commonly called Gypsies.  The language is often called Romanes.

The first Gospel to be translated into a Romani language was the Gospel of Luke into the Caló language, spoken in Spain and Portugal. It was translated by George Borrow. This was printed  by the British and Foreign Bible Society in 1837 and a revision was printed in 1872.

There are portions, and selections of the Bible in many different forms of Romani.webpage listing different Romani Scriptures  

The French Romani writer and pastor Matéo Maximoff translated the Bible into Kalderash Romani. The Psalms were first printed by the French Bible Society in 1984 and the New Testament was printed in 1995.

References

Romani
Romani language
Romani religion
Romani Christians